Macey Harlam (April 27, 1873 – June 17, 1923) was a stage and screen actor from New York. He performed on Broadway from 1901 to 1918 before switching to silent films. In films he appeared with Pauline Frederick, Douglas Fairbanks, Elsie Ferguson, Geraldine Farrar and Lionel Barrymore. He died at Saranac Lake, New York in 1923.

Selected filmography
The Eternal City (1915)
Betty of Greystone (1916)
The Witch (1916)
The Habit of Happiness (1916)
The Perils of Divorce (1916)
Manhattan Madness (1916)
Nanette of the Wilds (1916)
 The Romantic Journey (1916)
Barbary Sheep (1917)
Flame of the Desert (1919)
The Woman and the Puppet (1920)
The Right to Love (1920)
The Plaything of Broadway (1921)
 After Midnight (1921)
The Conquest of Canaan (1921)
 You Find It Everywhere (1921)
Always the Woman (1922)
When Knighthood Was in Flower (1922)
The Face in the Fog (1922)
 The Tents of Allah (1923)
Bella Donna (1923)
 Broadway Broke (1923)

References

External links

 Macey Harlam at IMDb.com
Macey Harlam at IBDb.com
portraits(New York Public Library, B. Rose collection)
kinotv.com

1873 births
1923 deaths
American male stage actors
American male silent film actors
20th-century American male actors